The Pleydell Baronetcy, of Coleshill in the County of Berkshire (now Oxfordshire), was a title in the Baronetage of Great Britain. It was created on 15 June 1732 for Mark Stuart Pleydell. The title became extinct on his death in 1768. His daughter and only child, Harriet Pleydell, married William Bouverie, 1st Earl of Radnor. Their son Jacob Pleydell-Bouverie, 2nd Earl of Radnor, succeeded to the Pleydell estates and assumed the additional surname of Pleydell.

Pleydell baronets, of Coleshill (1732)

Sir Mark Stuart Pleydell, 1st Baronet (–1768)

See also
Earl of Radnor for Pleydell-Bouverie baronets

References

Extinct baronetcies in the Baronetage of Great Britain